María Antonia "Toña" Is Piñera (born in Oviedo, 1966) is a Spanish former football defender who played through her career for CFF Tradehi. She earned 33 caps for the Spain women's national football team from 1989 through the 1990s, taking part in the 1997 European Championship.
 As manager of the Spain women's national under-17 football team, she led the squad to the nation's first ever world cup championship on the women's side, winning against Mexico women's national under-17 football team 2–1. In December 2020, she was named head coach of Pachuca Femenil.

References

1966 births
Living people
Spanish women's footballers
Spain women's international footballers
Primera División (women) players
Spanish football managers
Female association football managers
Footballers from Asturias
People from Oviedo
Women's association football defenders
Real Oviedo (women) players